Pageton is a census-designated place (CDP) in McDowell County, West Virginia, United States. As of the 2010 census, its population was 187. Pageton is located on the Tug Fork Branch of the Norfolk and Western Railway, along the Pocahontas seam of rich bituminous coal. Pageton is located on State Route 161 between Thorpe and Anawalt.

History
Pageton was named after Louis R. Page, a colliery official.

Legacy
Although coal mining activity ended long ago, the Page Coal and Coke Company Store at Pageton survives, and is listed on the National Register of Historic Places.

References

External links
 Virginian Railway (VGN) Enthusiasts non-profit group of preservationists, authors, photographers, historians, modelers, and railfans
 listing of Virginian Railway  authors and their works

Census-designated places in McDowell County, West Virginia
Census-designated places in West Virginia
Coal towns in West Virginia